A general election was held in the United Kingdom on 1 May 1997 and all 72 seats in Scotland were contested. This would be the last UK general election to be contested in Scotland before the Scottish Parliament was established on 1 July 1999  following overwhelming public approval in a referendum.

MPs 
List of MPs for constituencies in Scotland (1997–2001)

Top target seats of the main parties

Labour targets

SNP targets

Conservative targets

Liberal Democrat targets

Results
Below is a table summarising the results of the 1997 general election in Scotland.

Votes summary

Outcome

The election saw the Conservatives lose every seat that they held in Scotland, although the party were third in terms of vote share (winning 17.5% of votes cast in Scotland). By contrast the Liberal Democrats won 13% of votes cast, but  won ten seats, a net gain of one on the previous election. The SNP finished second in terms of vote share with 22%, but only won six seats. Labour won 45.6% of the vote and 56 seats, a net gain of seven on 1992. The defeated Conservative included three cabinet ministers: the Secretary of State for Scotland, Michael Forsyth lost Stirling to Labour, the Foreign Secretary Malcolm Rifkind lost Edinburgh Pentlands, also to Labour,  while Ian Lang, President of the Board of Trade, lost Galloway and Upper Nithsdale to the SNP.

Notes

References

1997 in Scotland
1990s elections in Scotland
1997
Scotland